Wachira Sangsri (born March 14, 1986) is a professional footballer from Thailand. He currently plays for Phichit  in the Thai Division 1 League.

References 

1986 births
Living people
Wachira Sangsri
Wachira Sangsri
Association football defenders
Wachira Sangsri
Wachira Sangsri
Wachira Sangsri
Wachira Sangsri
Wachira Sangsri
Wachira Sangsri
Wachira Sangsri
Wachira Sangsri